Gifford or Giffords may refer to:

People
Gifford (given name)
Gifford (surname)
Gabby Giffords (b. 1970), a former United States politician

Places

Canada
 Gifford Peninsula, on the South Coast of British Columbia
 Gifford, British Columbia, a locality in the Matsqui Prairie area of the City of Abbotsford, British Columbia
 Gifford Slough, a slough in the Matsqui Prairie area of the City of Abbotsford, British Columbia
 Gifford Creek, a creek in the Cariboo region of the British Columbia Interior

England
 Aveton Gifford, Devon
 Bowers Gifford, Essex
 Broughton Gifford, Wiltshire
 Crowmarsh Gifford, Oxfordshire
 Fonthill Gifford, Wiltshire
 Stoke Gifford, Gloucestershire

Scotland
 Gifford, East Lothian
 Giffordland, North Ayrshire

United States
 Gifford Park, a neighborhood of Omaha, Nebraska
 Gifford, Florida
 Gifford, Idaho
 Gifford, Illinois
 Gifford, Indiana
 Gifford, Iowa
 Gifford, New York
 Gifford Creek (New York), a creek
 Gifford, Pennsylvania
 Gifford, South Carolina
 Gifford, Washington
 South Gifford, Missouri

Enterprises
 Baillie Gifford, a UK investment management firm
 Gifford (company), a UK consulting engineering firm
 Gifford's Circus, a British circus
 Gifford's Ice Cream & Candy Co., a brand of ice cream, Washington DC, United States

Other uses
 4819 Gifford, a minor planet in the Solar System
 A. T. Gifford (ship), the last whaling schooner to cruise Hudson Bay
 Ashton Gifford House, Codford, Wiltshire, England
 Gifford Lectures, endowed by Scottish jurist Adam Gifford
 Gifford Observatory, Wellington, New Zealand
 Gifford Pinchot National Forest, Washington, United States
 Gifford Pinchot State Park, Pennsylvania, United States
 Gifford School, a special education school in Weston, Massachusetts, United States
 Gifford State Forest (Ohio)
 USS Gabrielle Giffords (LCS-10), a ship in the United States Navy

See also
 Lord Gifford (disambiguation)
 Giffard (disambiguation)